Foucault's Pendulum (original title: Il pendolo di Foucault ) is a novel by Italian writer and philosopher Umberto Eco. It was first published in 1988, and an English translation by William Weaver appeared a year later.

Foucault's Pendulum is divided into ten segments represented by the ten Sefiroth. The satirical novel is full of esoteric references to Kabbalah, alchemy, and conspiracy theory—so many that critic and novelist Anthony Burgess suggested that it needed an index. The pendulum of the title refers to an actual pendulum designed by French physicist Léon Foucault to demonstrate Earth's rotation, which has symbolic significance within the novel. Some believe that it refers to Michel Foucault, noting Eco's friendship with the French philosopher, but the author "specifically rejects any intentional reference to Michel Foucault"—this is regarded as one of his subtle literary jokes.

Plot summary 

The book opens with a man named Casaubon hiding in the Musée des Arts et Métiers after closing. He believes that a secret society has kidnapped his friend Jacopo Belbo and are now after him, and will meet in the museum. As he waits, Casaubon reflects on his life that led him here, but it is implied he is an unreliable narrator whose mind has been warped by conspiracy theories.

In the 1970s Milan, Casaubon, who as a student had participated in the 1968 uprisings, is studying the Knights Templar when he meets Belbo and his colleague Diotallevi. Belbo works as an editor in a publishing house and invites Casaubon to review a manuscript about the Templars. The manuscript, by Colonel Ardenti, claims he discovered a secret plan of the Templars to take over the world. Ardenti mysteriously vanishes after meeting with Belbo and Casaubon. Casaubon moves to Brazil to pursue a relationship with a woman named Amparo and meets Agliè, an elderly man who implies that he is the mystical Comte de Saint-Germain. Casaubon's relationship with Amparo falls apart after attending an Umbanda rite and he returns to Milan, where he is hired by Belbo's employer, Mr. Garamond, as a researcher. Casaubon learns that in addition to a respected publishing house, Garamond also owns Manuzio, a vanity publisher that charges incompetent authors large sums to print their work. Garamond has the idea to begin two lines of occult books, one for serious publishing and the other to be published by Manutius to attract more vanity authors. Agliè, now also in Milan, becomes a consultant to Garamond. Belbo grows jealous of Agliè's ability to charm Belbo's former mistress Lorenza.

Belbo, Diotallevi, and Casaubon become submerged in occult manuscripts that draw flimsy connections between historical events and have the idea to develop their own as a game. Using Belbo's personal computer "Abulafia" and Ardenti's manuscript as a foundation, the three create what they call "The Plan" using a program that rearranges text at random. The Plan becomes an intricate web of conspiracy theories about the Templars and their goal to reshape the world using "telluric currents", which are focused at the Foucault pendulum. In addition to numerous other historical organizations apparently involved in The Plan, the three invent a fictional secret society, the Tres (Templi Resurgentes Equites Synarchici, Latin for "the Risen again Synarchic Knights of the Temple").

The three increasingly become obsessed with The Plan and wonder if it could be true. Diotallevi is diagnosed with cancer and attributes it to divine retribution for his role in The Plan. Belbo, overcome by his jealousy over Lorenza, discusses The Plan with Agliè and claims to be in possession of a Templar map of the telluric currents; Agliè demands to see it and is refused. Agliè, Garamond, Ardenti, and many of the manuscript authors, convince themselves they are the Tres, and Agliè is their leader, and he forces Belbo to come to Paris with him. Casaubon goes to Belbo's apartment and reads his personal files, and goes to Paris and Foucault's Pendulum to see Agliè and his associates.

In the present, a group led by Agliè gathers around the pendulum for an arcane ritual. Casaubon sees several ectoplasmic forms appear, one of which claims to be the real Comte de Saint-Germain and denounces Agliè in front of his followers. Belbo is questioned but he refuses to reveal what he knows, inciting a riot during which Belbo is hanged from Foucault's Pendulum. Casaubon escapes the museum and flees to the countryside villa where Belbo grew up. Casaubon soon learns that Diotallevi succumbed to his cancer at midnight on St. John's Eve, coincidentally the same time Belbo died.

Casaubon meditates on events and is resigned to capture by the Tres, and he will follow Belbo's lead and tell them nothing. While waiting in the villa, Casaubon finds an old manuscript by Belbo that relates a mystical experience he had when he was twelve, in which he perceived ultimate meaning beyond signs and semiotics. He realizes that much of Belbo's behavior and possibly his creation of the Plan and even his death was inspired by Belbo's desire to recapture that lost meaning.

Major themes 
Most books written in this fiction genre seem to focus on the mysterious, and aim to provide their own version of the conspiracy theory. Eco avoids this pitfall without holding back on the historical mystery surrounding the Knights Templar. In fact, the novel may be viewed as a critique, spoof, or deconstruction of the grand overarching conspiracies often found in postmodern literature, and indeed its very title may well allude to one of postmodernism's key exponents, Michel Foucault. Although the main plot does detail a conspiratorial "Plan", the book focuses on the development of the characters, and their slow transition from skeptical editors, mocking the Manutius manuscripts to credulous Diabolicals themselves. In this way, the conspiracy theory provided is a plot device, rather than an earnest proposition.

Belbo's writings are a recurrent theme throughout the book. The entire book is narrated in the first person by Casaubon, with brief interludes from the files on Abulafia. These passages are often eccentrically written, and deal in most part with Belbo's childhood, his constant sense of failure, and his obsession with Lorenza. The interludes from his childhood serve as a stark contrast to the mythical world of cults and conspiracies. Belbo is extremely careful to not try to create (literature), because he deems himself unworthy, although it becomes somewhat obvious that writing is his passion. This attitude of constant subconscious self-abasement fits in with the overall irony focused on in the book, considering that Belbo is eventually consumed by (re)creation of the Plan; one excerpt meant for the unattainable Lorenza reads,
 "I could not possess you, but I can blow up history."

Casaubon is a scholar: While Belbo seeks inner peace, Casaubon's quest is of knowledge. The uncertainty of scientific knowledge and human experience is explored in his character, as he participates in various extra-natural events. His narratives abandon his strict realism and become increasingly inclined towards the supernatural as the novel progresses, despite periodic reality checks from his partner Lia.

Mr. Garamond, whose primary business is selling dreams (through his vanity press outlet), comes to believe the fantasy world his authors weave. It is possible, though, that he had always been a "Diabolical", and founded his publishing business to fish for information.

Eco shows that if one stops discriminating between whether propositions are right or wrong, it is possible to link any fact or idea with any other, but that this creates a dangerous tendency towards conspiracy theories. As Diotallevi approaches death, he remarks:
 "I'm dying because I convinced myself that there was no order, that you could do whatever you liked with any text."

As Belbo approaches death, Casaubon remarks of him that:
 "... he refused to bow to nonmeaning. He somehow knew that fragile as our existence may be, however ineffectual our interrogation of the world, there is nevertheless something that has more meaning than the rest."

As Casaubon awaits death at the hands of those who incorrectly believe that he is withholding some occult information from them, he reflects that:
 "It makes no difference whether I write or not. They will look for other meanings, even in my silence."

Eco reinforces this theme by quoting Karl Popper at the heading of chapter 118:
 "The conspiracy theory of society ... comes from abandoning God and then asking: Who is in his place?."

Societies in the novel 

The following list among the groups that appear in Foucault's Pendulum. They include, in alphabetical order,
Assassins of Alamut, Bavarian Illuminati, Bogomils, Cabalists, Candomblé, Cathars, Church of Jesus Christ of Latter-day Saints, Elders of Zion, Freemasons, Gnostics, Jesuits, Knights Templar, Opus Dei, Ordo Templi Orientis, Panta Rei, and the Rosicrucians.

 An obscure one-time reference to the fictional Cthulhu cult through a quote from The Satanic Rituals – "I'a Cthulhu! I'a S'ha-t'n!". The words closed a ritual composed by Michael Aquino.
 The Church of Jesus Christ of Latter-day Saints (LDS Church) – Mr. Garamond included them in his list of "occult" organizations to contact about book ideas, explaining "I read about them in a detective story, too, but they may not exist anymore."

Comparison with other writings 
Foucault's Pendulum (1988) has been called "the thinking man's Da Vinci Code". The parchment that sparks the Plan plays a role which is similar to the parchments in the Rennes-le-Château story in Brown's novel and in The Holy Blood and the Holy Grail (1982), from which Brown drew inspiration. Eco's novel predated the Da Vinci phenomenon by more than a decade, but both novels are concerned with the Knights Templar, complex conspiracies, secret codes, and even a chase around the monuments of Paris. Eco does so, however, from a much more critical perspective; Foucault is more a satire on the futility of conspiracy theories and those who believe them, rather than an attempt to proliferate such beliefs.

Eco was asked whether he had read the Brown novel; he replied:
 I was obliged to read it because everybody was asking me about it. My answer is that Dan Brown is one of the characters in my novel Foucault's Pendulum, which is about people who start believing in occult stuff.
 – But you yourself seem interested in the kabbalah, alchemy, and other occult practices explored in the novel.
 No. In Foucault's Pendulum I wrote the grotesque representation of these kind of people. So Dan Brown is one of my creatures.

Eco was indebted to Danilo Kiš's story "The Book of Kings and Fools" in The Encyclopedia of the Dead (1983) for the portrayal of Sergei Nilus. The Boston Globe claimed that "one can trace a lineage from Robert Anton Wilson's The Illuminatus! Trilogy to Umberto Eco's Foucault's Pendulum". The Illuminatus! Trilogy was written 13 years before Foucault's Pendulum. George Johnson wrote on the similarity of the two books that "both works were written tongue in cheek, with a high sense of irony." Both books are divided into ten segments represented by the ten Sefiroth.

Foucault's Pendulum also bears a number of similarities to Eco's own experiences and writing. The character of Belbo was brought up in the region of Piedmont in Northern Italy. Eco refers to his own visit to a Candomblé ceremony in Brazil in an article compiled in Faith in Fakes, reminiscent of the episode in the novel. He also describes French ethnologist Roger Bastide who bears a resemblance to the character of Agliè. Eco's novel was also a direct inspiration on Charles Cecil during the development of Revolution Software's highly successful point and click adventure game Broken Sword: The Shadow of the Templars, in which an American tourist and a French journalist must thwart a conspiracy by a shadowy cabal who model themselves on the Knights Templar.

See also 
 El Club Dumas

Notes

References

References

External links 

 "Foucault pendulum video" Foucault pendulum at the Musée des arts et métiers, Paris, France) (video clip)
 Annotations at Umberto Eco Wiki  – A wiki guide to the novel.
 Foucault's Pendulum, reviewed by Ted Gioia (The New Canon)
 List of Eco's fiction with short introductions

1988 novels
20th-century Italian novels
Bompiani books
Italian satirical novels
Metafictional novels
Metaphysical fiction novels
Novels about secret societies
Novels by Umberto Eco
Novels set in Italy
Philosophical novels
Postmodern novels
Secret histories
Novels about the Illuminati